Navajo Kid is a 1945 American Western film directed by Harry L. Fraser for Alexander-Stern Productions and starring Bob Steele as the titular character, Syd Salor and Ed Cassidy. It was distributed by Producers Releasing Corporation (PRC) and commercially released in the United States on 21 November 1945. It was filmed in Corriganville, Ray Corrigan Ranch, Simi Valley, California, United States.

Plot
Tom Kirk, the "Navajo Kid", (Bob Steele) is determined to find his adoptive father's (George Morrel) murderer. When he finds Honest John Grogan (I. Stanford Jolly) with his father's ring, he immediately arrests him. While Honest John was indeed part of the gang which killed Joe Kirk, the gang-leader was Matt Crandall (Stanley Blystone). As Tom begins hunting for Matt, he soon discovers who his true biological father is.

Cast
 Bob Steele as Tom Kirk a.k.a. The Navajo Kid
 Syd Saylor as Happy
 Ed Cassidy as Sheriff Roy Landon
 Caren Marsh as Winnie McMasters
 Stanley Blystone as Matt Crandall

References

External links
 

American black-and-white films
1945 films
American Western (genre) films
1945 Western (genre) films
Films directed by Harry L. Fraser
Films shot in California
Films with screenplays by Harry L. Fraser
1940s English-language films
1940s American films